The A.B.C. of Love is a 1919 American silent drama film directed by Léonce Perret and starring Mae Murray, Holmes Herbert, and Dorothy Green. The film tells the love story between playwright Harry Bryant and an orphaned girl, Kate, whom he meets while driving through the countryside.

Cast
 Mae Murray as Kate 
 Holmes Herbert as Harry Bryant 
 Dorothy Green as Diana Nelson 
 Arthur Donaldson as Prof. George Collins

References

Bibliography
 Michael G. Ankerich. Mae Murray: The Girl with the Bee-stung Lips. University Press of Kentucky, 2012.

External links

1919 films
1919 drama films
Silent American drama films
Films directed by Léonce Perret
American silent feature films
1910s English-language films
American black-and-white films
Pathé Exchange films
1910s American films